Jeffrey Dennis Milyo is an American economist and professor of economics at the University of Missouri. He is also a senior fellow at the Cato Institute. One of his best-known studies is a 2005 one that he co-authored with Timothy Groseclose examining media bias. The study concluded that most major media outlets in the United States have a liberal bias, although its methodology has been criticized. He has also researched the political effects of campaign finance laws in the United States.

References

External links
 Faculty page
 

Living people
University of Missouri faculty
21st-century American economists
Cato Institute people
University of Connecticut alumni
Stanford University alumni
Year of birth missing (living people)